The Darwin Beer Can Regatta is a festival event which has been held annually since 1974 in Darwin, Northern Territory, Australia at Mindil Beach. The inaugural event had 63 entries and was attended by about 22,000 people which was about half of Darwin's population at the time.

Format 
Participants create boats using empty beer cans, soft drink (soda) cans, soft drink bottle and milk cartons. Up to 30,000 cans have been used for a single boat. The vessels  are not tested for seaworthiness, prior to water events, and those that fall apart are part of the day's entertainment. A great many sundry events go along with the regatta, including concerts, sandcastles, a thong-throwing contest and the "Henley-on-Mindil" competition (named after the Henley-on-Todd Regatta), where participants run their "boats" around like Flintstones cars.

Other events held on the day have included a thong-throwing contest and a competition for the best novelty hat.

History 
The Regatta was begun in 1974  by Darwin businessmen, Lutz Frankenfeld and Paul Rice-Chapman, as a way to clean up beer cans littering Darwin's streets.

The Darwin Regional Tourism Promotion Association was the organiser of the event until 1978 when it came under the aegis of the combined Lions Clubs of Darwin.

In the 1980s the Regatta had about 18 classes, which included motorised beer can boats.

The 2014 Darwin Lions Beer Can Regatta took place on 6 July 2014, watched by 15,000 people and attended by visitors from all over Australia.  The winner of the first beer can regatta was Kevin Jaques driving the Darwin Powerboat Club's entry "Pistol Knight".  Des Hoare the cricketer and then Sales Manager for Swan Brewery Darwin, presented Jaques with the winning cheques totalling $1,000, doubled because the beer can boat used only Swan beer cans.  As Jaques used his 80 hp Mercury Motor he was also presented with a Mercury First sticker.  The perpetual trophy is held within the NT Museum storage area and the keepsake trophy is on the mantlepiece at Jaques' home.  Jaques holds copies of the news clippings and the photographs of the presentations.

In 2020 the Beer Can Regatta was cancelled due to the COVID pandemic. In its place, on 8 August a much smaller, 4-hour, Mini-Regatta was held in which the vessels were made of milk cartons. Located at Darwin Waterfront Precinct, instead of the usual Mindil Beach venue where as many as 15,000 watched the races, only a few hundred spectators attended.

In 2021 the Regatta was back at Mindil Beach on Sunday 5 September from 10am to 5pm., and in 2022 it was on 26 June. In 2023 it will be on the 16th July.

See also
 Beer Can House

References

External links

 

Recurring events established in 1974
Festivals in the Northern Territory
Tourist attractions in Darwin, Northern Territory
Beer festivals in Australia
1974 establishments in Australia
Annual sporting events in Australia
Boat shows in Australia
Boat festivals
Sport in Darwin, Northern Territory